Morten Andreas Leigh Aabel (10 February 1830 – 9 May 1901) was a Norwegian physician and poet.

Biography
He was born at Sogndal in Sogn og Fjordane, Norway. His father, Peter Pavels Aabel (1795-1869), was the vicar and senior priest in Sogndal from 1824–1833. He was a brother of priest, Oluf Andreas Aabel (1825–1895).

He enrolled as a student in 1848, graduated with the cand.med. degree in 1856. Professionally, he worked as a physician from 1853 to 1899, and was a district physician in several Norwegian districts. He first worked as a district physician in Hammerfest followed by private practice in Åsnes. At the end of the 1850s, Aabel became a doctor at Nes in Romerike. In 1864 he was appointed a district physician in Sunnfjord, and the family settled  at  Falkenstein  in Førde. From 1876 to 1885 he was a doctor in Nord Aurdal in Valdres. In 1885 he was appointed a district doctor at Toten where he stayed for ten years. Aabel moved to Gjøvik in 1895  and in 1899 he retired.

While studying he was a member of the Literary Association and the Norwegian Students' Society. He started writing poems and songs, and continued after graduation.

In 1857 he married Wilhelmine Louise Collett (1834–1901), a descendant of Christian Ancher Collett. Their son Hauk Aabel was a notable actor and through him, Andreas was a grandfather of actors Per Aabel and Andreas Aabel. Through his sister  Christine Margrethe Aabel (1827–1887), he was the uncle of Hartvig Andreas, Gerhard, Margrethe and Carl Oscar Munthe.

Works 

 Rimstubber (1862)
 Høstblomster
 Rimstubber II (1896)

References

1830 births
1901 deaths
People from Sogndal
University of Oslo alumni
19th-century Norwegian physicians
19th-century Norwegian poets
Norwegian male poets
19th-century Norwegian male writers